The 2014 United States Senate election in Alabama took place on November 4, 2014, to elect a member of the United States Senate for Alabama.

Incumbent Republican Senator Jeff Sessions, who served in the position since 1997, ran for re-election to a fourth term in office. As the Democrats did not field a candidate, he was the only candidate to file before the deadline and was therefore unopposed in the Republican primary election and only faced write-in opposition in the general election.

Sessions was re-elected with 97.25% of the vote with the remaining votes being write-ins.

Republican primary

Candidates

Declared
 Jeff Sessions, incumbent U.S. Senator since 1997

Independents
An independent candidate would have been able to challenge Sessions if at least 44,828 signatures had been submitted by June 3, 2014. None did so.

General election

Candidates

On ballot
 Jeff Sessions (Republican), incumbent U.S. Senator

Write-in
 Victor Sanchez Williams (Democratic), attorney

Fundraising

Predictions

Polling

Results

Aftermath
Sessions did not complete this term, which ran through January 3, 2021; he resigned on February 9, 2017, to become Attorney General under the Trump administration. This triggered the interim appointment of Luther Strange to fill the vacancy until Democrat Doug Jones won a special election later that year. On November 7, 2019, Sessions announced that he would stand for this US Senate seat again in 2020 when it was due for its regularly-scheduled election, though he was defeated in the runoff primary by football coach Tommy Tuberville, who would go onto win the general election.

See also
 2014 Alabama elections

 2014 United States Senate elections
 2014 United States elections

References

External links
U.S. Senate elections in Alabama, 2014 at Ballotpedia
Campaign contributions at OpenSecrets
Jeff Sessions for U.S. Senate

2014
Alabama
2014 Alabama elections
Single-candidate elections